Broad Cairn is a mountain in the Grampians of Scotland, located about sixteen miles south of the River Dee near Balmoral.

Munros
Mountains and hills of the Eastern Highlands
Mountains and hills of Aberdeenshire